Southern Pacific 975 is a 2-10-2 type of steam locomotive, built in 1918 by American Locomotive Company at the former Brooks Locomotive Works plant in Dunkirk, New York. It entered service on Southern Pacific subsidiary Texas and New Orleans Railroad in March 1918, where it worked until its retirement in 1957.

The T&NO donated the locomotive to the city of Beaumont, Texas, on February 2, 1957, with the project spearheaded by then Mayor Jimmie P. Cokinos. No. 975 is now preserved in static display at the Illinois Railway Museum in Union, Illinois. It is one of only two Southern Pacific locomotives of this wheel arrangement to be preserved; the other is 982, which has moved to Union Station, Minute Maid Baseball Park in Houston, Texas in 2005.

References 
 
 

0975
ALCO locomotives
2-10-2 locomotives
Individual locomotives of the United States
Standard gauge locomotives of the United States
Railway locomotives introduced in 1918

Preserved steam locomotives of Illinois